James Carmichael (14 December 1894 – 1967) was a Scottish footballer who played in the Football League for Grimsby Town.

References

Scottish footballers
English Football League players
1894 births
1967 deaths
West Bromwich Albion F.C. players
Mid Rhondda F.C. players
Grimsby Town F.C. players
Worksop Town F.C. players
Association football forwards